The Best of Bob Dylan, Vol. 2 is a compilation album released in the U.K., New Zealand, Australia and Canada on November 28, 2000. It is the sequel to The Best of Bob Dylan, Vol. 1, released 3 years earlier. It was later released in Europe and Japan; although it has never been released in the United States.

Track listing 

Both live songs were recorded on March 16, 2000, at the Santa Cruz Civic Auditorium, Santa Cruz, California.

Chart performance

References

2000 greatest hits albums
Albums produced by Bob Johnston
Albums produced by Bob Dylan
Albums produced by Brendan O'Brien (record producer)
Albums produced by Daniel Lanois
Albums produced by Don DeVito
Albums produced by John Hammond (producer)
Albums produced by Rob Fraboni
Albums produced by Tom Wilson (record producer)
Bob Dylan compilation albums
Columbia Records compilation albums